Love Somebody is the twenty-ninth studio album from American country music singer Reba McEntire. It was released on April 14, 2015, by Nash Icon. This is McEntire's first studio album since the 2010 release of All the Women I Am. "Going Out Like That" was released as the album's first single on January 6, 2015, and it has charted within the top 30 of Country Airplay. McEntire produced the album with Tony Brown, James Stroud, and Doug Sisemore. The album has also been released on LP.

Background
In October 2014, when it was announced that McEntire had signed with Nash Icon, it was revealed that McEntire had begun working a new album. Eleven tracks had already been produced. When the album's first single "Going Out Like That" debuted on the Hot Country Songs chart, it was said that the album would be released in April 2015. On February 13, 2015, the album's release date, title and track listing were announced. McEntire's wrote on her website, "We've been working on it a long time and we can't wait to hear what you think about it. As you all know, I love looking for songs to record. I've said that many times. Getting to work again with Allison Jones over at Nash Icon Records (part of the Big Machine Label group) was a blast! We listened to thousands of songs to find just the right ones for this album. The album has 12 songs and there will be a Target exclusive version with two extra tracks." The album will also be available on vinyl LP through McEntire's web page. Over 25,000 copies of the album were pre-ordered before the actual release date.

In October 2016, the LP was made available in store at Cracker Barrel locations across the country in special promotion with her new Christmas CD.

Commercial performance
Love Somebody debuted at number one on the Billboard Top Country Albums chart, her twelfth number one album on the chart, and number three on the US Billboard 200, selling 62,469 copies in the US. The album has sold 307,800 copies in the US as of March 2018. This is McEntire's fifteenth album to achieve a #1 chart slot.

Track listing

 "Pray for Peace" was not included in the LP version of the album.

Personnel 
Adapted from the liner notes.

Musicians
 Reba McEntire – lead vocals
 Jennifer Nettles – lead vocals (2)
 Gordon Mote – acoustic piano, keyboards
 Steve Nathan – acoustic piano, keyboards, synthesizers, Hammond B3 organ
 Jimmy Nichols – keyboards
 Doug Sisemore – keyboards, programming, acoustic guitar, electric guitar, percussion
 Ilya Toshinsky – acoustic guitar, electric guitar, banjo, bouzouki
 Biff Watson – acoustic guitar
 Kenny Greenberg – electric guitar
 Brent Mason – electric guitar
 Paul Franklin – steel guitar
 Aubrey Haynie – fiddle, mandolin
 Jimmy Mattingly – fiddle, mandolin
 Mike Brignardello – bass guitar
 Mark Hill – bass guitar
 Michael Rhodes – bass guitar
 Tommy Harden – drums, percussion
 Greg Morrow – drums, percussion, programming
 Lonnie Wilson – drums
 Jay Dawson – bagpipes
 Ethan Mattingly – French horn
 Jonathan Yudkin – cello

Background vocals
 Bob Bailey
 Kelly Clarkson
 Perry Coleman
 Ronnie Dunn
 Reba McEntire
 Kim Fleming
 Vicki Hampton
 Tania Hancheroff
 Tommy Harden
 Wes Hightower
 Caroline Kole
 Gary Oliver
 Doug Sisemore
 Jenifer Wrinkle

Choir
 Gary Oliver – choir director
 Shawnel Corley
 Shawn Davis
 Melinda Doolittle
 Hope Loftis
 Gale Mayes
 Kimberly Mont
 Royce Mosley
 Angela Primm
 Debi Selby

Production 
 Tony Brown – producer (1, 3, 4, 7-11, 14)
 Reba McEntire – producer (1, 3, 4, 7-11, 14)
 James Stroud – producer (2, 5, 6, 13)
 Doug Sisemore – producer (12)
 Allison Jones – A&R
 Chuck Ainlay – recording (1, 3, 4, 7-11), mixing (3, 6, 8, 11, 12)
 Julian King – recording (2, 5, 6)
 Todd Tidwell – additional recording (1, 3, 4, 7, 8, 10), recording assistant (1-11),  mix assistant (3, 6, 8, 11, 12), recording (12)
 Chris Ashburn – recording assistant (1-10, 12)
 Shawn Daugherty – recording assistant (1, 3, 8, 10, 12)
 Sean Badum – recording assistant (4, 7)
 Chris Lord-Alge – mixing (1, 2, 4, 5, 7, 10)
 Derek Bason – mixing (9)
 Keith Armstrong – mix assistant (1, 2, 4, 5, 7, 10)
 Nik Karpen – mix assistant (1, 2, 4, 5, 7, 10)
 Zach Reynolds – mix assistant (8)
 Chris Small – mix assistant (9)
 Andrew Mendelson – mastering
 Natthaphol Abhigantaphand – mastering assistant
 Andrew Darby – mastering assistant
 Steve Dewey – mastering assistant
 Adam Grover – mastering assistant
 Amy Garges – production coordinator (1, 3, 4, 7-11, 14)
 Tammy Luker – production coordinator (2, 5, 6, 13)
 Doug Rich – production coordinator (2, 5, 6, 13)
 Justin McIntosh – art direction, graphic design 
 Sandi Spika Borchetta – art direction
 Jeremy Cowart – photography

Studios 
 Recorded at Starstruck Studios and Blackbird Studios (Nashville, Tennessee).
 Additional recording at Starstruck Studios.
 Mixed at Starstruck Studios (Nashville, Tennessee) and Mix LA (Los Angeles, California).
 Mastered at Georgetown Masters (Nashville, Tennessee).

Chart performance

Album
Weekly

Year-end

Singles

Release history

References

2015 albums
Reba McEntire albums
Big Machine Records albums
Albums produced by Tony Brown (record producer)
Albums produced by James Stroud